Vilmoș Gheorghe (3 February 1941 – 16 December 2001) was a Romanian biathlete who competed in the 1964 Winter Olympics, 1968 Winter Olympics and 1972 Winter Olympics. He was born in Valea Strâmbă, Harghita County (at that time Tekerőpatak, Hungary).

Olympic results

References

1941 births
2001 deaths
Romanian male biathletes
Olympic biathletes of Romania
Biathletes at the 1964 Winter Olympics
Biathletes at the 1968 Winter Olympics
Biathletes at the 1972 Winter Olympics
People from Harghita County